Hiram na Anak (lit. Borrowed Child) is a 2019 Philippine television drama series starring Yasmien Kurdi, Leanne Bautista and Dion Ignacio. The series premiered on GMA Network's noontime block and worldwide on GMA Pinoy TV from February 25 to May 3, 2019.

The series ended, but its the 9th-week run, and with a total of 48 episodes.

Series overview

Episodes

February 2019

March 2019

April 2019

May 2019

References

Lists of Philippine drama television series episodes